This is a list of provosts of the Trinity College, University of Toronto. At Trinity college, the Provost is the Senior academic administrator and is also the college's chief officer of advancement.

Provosts

1851-1881: George Whitaker (educator) 
1881-1894: Charles W. E. Body 
1895-1899: Edward A. Welch
1900-1921: Thomas C. S. Macklem
1921-1926: Charles A. Seager
1926-1945: Francis H. Cosgrave
1945-1957: Reginald S. K. Seeley
1957-1972: Derwyn R. G. Owen
1972-1978: George Ignatieff
1979-1986: F. Kenneth Hare
1986-1996: Robert H. Painter
1996-2002: William Thomas Delworth
2002-2007: Margaret MacMillan
2007-2013: Andy Orchard
2014–present: Mayo Moran

References 

University of Toronto